The 2022 Rochford District Council election took place on 5 May 2022 to elect members of Rochford District Council in England. This was on the same day as other local elections.

Results summary

Ward results

Downhall & Rawreth

Foulness & The Wakerings

Hawkwell East

Hawkwell West

Hockley

Hockley & Ashingdon

Hullbridge

Lodge

Roche North & Rural

Roche South

Sweyne Park & Grange

Trinity

Wheatley

References

Rochford
Rochford District Council elections
2020s in Essex
May 2022 events in the United Kingdom